Priscilla Mokaba was a South African political activist. She was the mother of Peter Mokaba, a former deputy minister and member of parliament in South Africa. Priscilla was one of several political activists put in jail in South Africa during the 1980s. She was described as "a distinguished activist who had stood firm against the apartheid regime" by the African National Congress.

Priscilla continued her services to her community until her death. It is reported that she was working with female soccer teams in her home country. She also taught beadwork and ran a "vegetable project."  Mokaba died at the age of 76 on December 22, 2013. President Jacob Zuma offered a state funeral in her honor.

References

Year of birth missing
2013 deaths
20th-century South African people
20th-century South African women
21st-century South African people
21st-century South African women
South African activists
South African women activists